Double homeobox A pseudogene 8 is a protein that in humans is encoded by the DUXAP8 gene.

Function

Homeobox genes encode DNA-binding proteins, many of which are thought to be involved in early embryonic development. Homeobox genes encode a DNA-binding domain of 60 to 63 amino acids referred to as the homeodomain. This pseudogene is a member of the DUXA homeobox gene family.

References